Coherent states have been introduced in a physical context, first as quasi-classical states in quantum mechanics, then as the backbone of quantum optics and they are described in that spirit in the article Coherent states (see also). However, they have generated a huge variety of generalizations, which have led to a tremendous amount of literature in mathematical physics.
In this article, we sketch the main directions of research on this line. For further details, we refer to several existing surveys.

A general definition 
Assume that this set of vectors possesses the following properties:
A set of vectors  satisfying the two properties above is called a family of generalized coherent states. In order to recover the previous definition (given in the article Coherent state) of canonical or standard coherent states (CCS), it suffices to take , the complex plane and 

 runs through , forming a reproducing kernel Hilbert space.
The objective in both cases is to ensure that an arbitrary vector  be expressible as a linear (integral) combination of these vectors. Indeed, the resolution of the identity immediately implies that

where .

where  is the reproducing kernel, which satisfies the following properties

Some examples 

We present in this section some of the more commonly used types of coherent states, as illustrations of the general structure given above.

Nonlinear coherent states 

A large class of generalizations of the CCS is obtained by a simple modification of their analytic structure. Let  be an infinite sequence of positive numbers. Define  and by convention set . In the same Fock space in which the CCS were described, we now define the related deformed or nonlinear coherent states by the expansion

The normalization factor  is chosen so that . These generalized coherent states are overcomplete in the Fock space and satisfy a resolution of the identity

 being an open disc in the complex plane of radius , the radius of convergence of the series
 (in the case of the CCS, .) The measure  is generically of the form  (for ), where  is related to the  through the moment condition.

Once again, we see that for an arbitrary vector  in the Fock space, the function  is of the form , where  is an analytic function on the domain . The reproducing kernel associated to these coherent states is

Barut–Girardello coherent states 

By analogy with the CCS case, one can define a generalized annihilation operator  by its action on the vectors ,

and its adjoint operator . These act on the Fock states  as

Depending on the exact values of the quantities , these two operators, together with the identity  and all their commutators, could generate a wide range of algebras including various types of deformed quantum algebras. The term 'nonlinear', as often applied to these generalized coherent states, comes again from quantum optics where many such families of states are used in studying the interaction between the radiation field and atoms, where the strength of the interaction itself depends on the frequency of radiation. Of course, these coherent states will not in general have either the group theoretical or the minimal uncertainty properties of the CCS (there might have more general ones).

A typical example is obtained from the representations of the Lie algebra of SU(1,1) on the Fock space.

Gazeau–Klauder coherent states 

A non-analytic extension of the above expression of the non-linear coherent states is often used to define generalized coherent states associated to physical Hamiltonians having pure point spectra. These coherent states, known as Gazeau–Klauder coherent states, are labelled by action-angle variables.

where again  is a normalization factor, which turns out to be dependent on  only. These coherent states satisfy the temporal stability condition,

and the action identity,

Actually the construction of Gazeau–Klauder CS can be extended to vector CS and to Hamiltonians with degenerate spectra, as shown by Ali and Bagarello.

Heat kernel coherent states
These coherent states have a resolution of the identity that leads to a Segal-Bargmann space over the complexification. Hall's results were extended to compact symmetric spaces, including spheres, by Stenzel. The heat kernel coherent states, in the case , have been applied in the theory of quantum gravity by Thiemann and his collaborators. Although there are two different Lie groups involved in the construction, the heat kernel coherent states are not of Perelomov type.

The group-theoretical approach 

Gilmore and Perelomov, independently, realized that the construction of coherent states may sometimes be viewed as a group theoretical problem.

In order to see this, let us go back for a while to the case of CCS. However, before going on with the CCS, take first the general case.

Let  be a locally compact group and suppose that it has a continuous, irreducible representation  on a Hilbert space  by unitary operators .

converges. Given a square integrable representation  and an admissible vector , let us define the vectors

These vectors are the analogues of the canonical coherent states, written there in terms of the representation of the Heisenberg group (however, see the section on Gilmore-Perelomov CS, below). Next, it can be shown that the resolution of the identity

Thus, the vectors  constitute a family of generalized coherent states.

An example: wavelets 

A typical example of the above construction is provided by the affine group of the line, . This is the group of all 2×2 matrices of the type,

The affine group has a unitary irreducible representation on the Hilbert space .

If  is a function in  such that its Fourier transform
 satisfies the (admissibility) condition

then it can be shown to be an admissible vector, i.e.,

Thus, following the general construction outlined above, the vectors

define a family of generalized coherent states and one has the resolution of the identity

In the signal analysis literature, a vector satisfying the admissibility condition above is called a mother wavelet and the generalized coherent states  are called wavelets.

is called the continuous wavelet transform of the signal .

This concept can be extended to two dimensions, the group  being replaced by the so-called similitude group of the plane, which consists of plane translations, rotations and global dilations. The resulting 2D wavelets, and some generalizations of them, are widely used in image processing.

Gilmore–Perelomov coherent states 

The construction of coherent states using group representations described above is not sufficient. Already it cannot yield the CCS, since these are not indexed by the elements of the Heisenberg group, but rather by points of the quotient of the latter by its center, that quotient being precisely . The key observation is that the center of the Heisenberg group leaves the vacuum vector  invariant, up to a phase.

Let  be the left coset space and
Choosing a coset representative , for each coset , we define the vectors

The dependence of these vectors on the specific choice of the coset representative  is only through a phase. Hence, quantum mechanically, both  and  represent the same physical state and in particular, the projection operator  depends only on the coset. Vectors  defined in this way are called Gilmore–Perelomov coherent states. In this definition of generalized coherent states, no resolution of the identity is postulated.

is bounded, then it is necessarily a multiple of the identity and a resolution of the identity is again retrieved.

Gilmore–Perelomov coherent states have been generalized to quantum groups, but for this we refer to the literature.

Further generalization: Coherent states on coset spaces 

The Perelomov construction can be used to define coherent states for any locally compact group. On the other hand, particularly in case of failure of the Gilmore–Perelomov construction, there exist other constructions of generalized coherent states, using group representations, which generalize the notion of square integrability to homogeneous spaces of the group.

Briefly, in this approach one starts with a unitary irreducible representation  and attempts to find a vector , a subgroup  and a section  such that

Thus, it is useful for many physically important groups, such as the Poincaré group or the Euclidean group, which do not have square integrable representations in the sense of the earlier definition. In particular, the integral condition defining the operator  ensures that any vector  in  can be written in terms of the generalized coherent states  namely,

which is the primary aim of any kind of coherent states.

Coherent states: a Bayesian construction for the quantization of a measure set 

We now depart from the standard situation and present a general method of construction of coherent states, starting from a few observations on the structure of these objects as superpositions of eigenstates of some self-adjoint operator, as was the harmonic oscillator Hamiltonian for the standard CS. It is the essence of quantum mechanics that this superposition has a probabilistic flavor. As a matter of fact, we notice that the probabilistic structure of the canonical coherent states involves two probability distributions that underlie their construction. There are, in a sort of duality, a Poisson distribution ruling the probability of detecting  excitations when the quantum system is in a coherent state , and a gamma distribution on the set  of complex parameters, more exactly on the range  of the square of the radial variable. The generalization follows that duality scheme. Let us choose in  a finite or countable orthonormal set :

In case of infinite countability, this set must obey the (crucial) finiteness condition:

resolves the identity in :

Such a relation allows us to implement a coherent state or frame quantization of the set of parameters  by associating to a function  that satisfies appropriate conditions the following operator in :

The operator  is symmetric if  is real-valued, and it is self-adjoint (as a quadratic form) if  is real and semi-bounded. The original  is an upper symbol, usually non-unique, for the operator .

has mild functional properties to be made precise according to further topological properties granted to the original set .
A last point of this construction of the space of quantum states concerns its statistical aspects.
There is indeed an interplay between two probability distributions:

See also 
 Coherent states
 Lieb conjecture
 Quantization

References 

Mathematical physics